Pt.Hariprasad Chaurasia (born 1 July 1938) is an Indian music director and classical flautist, who plays the bansuri, in the Hindustani classical tradition.

Early life
Chaurasia was born in Allahabad (1938) (officially called Prayagraj) in the Indian state of Uttar Pradesh. His mother died when he was six years old. He had to learn music without his father's knowledge, as his father wanted him to become a wrestler. Chaurasia did go to the Akhada and trained with his father for some time, although he also started learning music and practising at his friend's house.

He has stated,

Career

Chaurasia started learning vocal music from his neighbour, Rajaram, at the age of 15. Later, he switched to playing the flute under the tutelage of Bholanath Prasanna of Varanasi for eight years. He joined the All India Radio, Cuttack, Odisha in 1957 and worked as a composer and performer.  Much later, while working for All India Radio, he received guidance from the reclusive Annapurna Devi, daughter of Baba Allaudin Khan. She only agreed to teach him if he was willing to unlearn all that he had learnt until then. Another version is that she only agreed to teach him after he took the decision to switch from right-handed to left-handed playing to show her his commitment. In any case Chaurasia plays left-handed to this day.

Apart from classical music, Hariprasad has collaborated with Shivkumar Sharma, forming a group called Shiv-Hari. The pair composed music for many popular movies, including Silsila and Chandni, and created some highly popular songs. Chaurasia also collaborated with Bhubaneswar Mishra, forming the pair "Bhuban-Hari" (in line with Shiv-Hari), and the pair composed music for many Odia movies, creating numerous songs that were hugely popular in the state. These include Muje janena kaha baata (sung by Suman Kalyanpur; movie: Gapa helebi Sata); and all songs from Maa o Mamata, and many more.

Chaurasia's nephew and pupil Rakesh Chaurasia is a highly accomplished flautist now, and has been performing globally with such eminent maestros as Ustad Zakir Hussain.

He serves as the artistic director of the World Music Department at the Rotterdam Music Conservatory in the Netherlands. He was also the founder of the Vrindavan Gurukul in Mumbai (opened 2006) and Vrindavan Gurukul in Bhubaneshwar (opened 2010). Both of these institutes are schools dedicated to training students in bansuri in the Guru-shishya tradition.

He has collaborated with several western musicians, including John McLaughlin, Jan Garbarek, and Ken Lauber, and has composed music for Indian films. Chaurasia also played on The Beatles' 1968 B-side "The Inner Light", which was written by George Harrison.  He also played with George Harrison on his first solo release, Wonderwall Music, and with Harrison, Ravi Shankar and others on the Dark Horse Records release Shankar Family & Friends.

Personal life
Chaurasia has married twice, first to Kamala Devi  and then Anuradha Roy. He has three sons. With first wife Kamala Devi he has two sons, Vinay and Ajay. With Anuradha, Chaurasia has a son named Rajeev. Chaurasia has five granddaughters and a grandson. His nephew Rakesh Chaurasia is also a flautist and carrying forward the family legacy.

In popular culture
The 2013 documentary film Bansuri Guru features the life and legacy of Chaurasia and was directed by the musician's son Rajeev Chaurasia and produced by the Films Division, Ministry of Information and Broadcasting, Government of India.

Awards
 Sangeet Natak Academy - 1984
 Konark Samman - 1992
 Padma Bhushan - 1992
 Yash Bharati Samman - 1994
 Padma Vibhushan - 2000
 Pandit Chatur Lal Excellence Award - 2015
 Hafiz Ali Khan Award - 2000
 Dinanath Mangeshkar Award - 2000
 Pune Pandit Award - 2008, by The Art & Music Foundation, Pune, India
 Akshaya Samman - 2009
 Honorary Doctorate, North Orissa University - 2008
 Honorary Doctorate, Utkal University - 2011
 National Eminence award, NADA VIDYA BHARTI by Visakha Music and Dance Academy, Vizag - 2009
 The 25 Greatest Global Living Legends In India by NDTV - 2013
 Gansamradni Lata Mangeshkar Award - 2021-22

Books
 Official Biography 'Breath of Gold' by Sathya Saran- 2019
'Hariprasad Chaurasia: Romance of the Bamboo Reed', by Uma Vasudev - 2005
 Official biography "Woodwinds of Change" by Surjit Singh - 2008
 'Hariprasad Chaurasia and the Art of Improvisation', by Henri Tournier
 'Bansuri Samrat : Hariprasad Chaurasia', by Surjit Singh

Discography

These are major albums released by Hariprasad Chaurasia

1967
 Call of the Valley with Shivkumar Sharma and Brij Bhushan Kabra
1978
 Krishnadhwani 60
1981
 Pt. Hariprasad Chaurasia - Flute
1984
 Pt. Hariprasad Chaurasia - Flute (different set of ragas, same album name)
1987
 Morning to Midnight Ragas - Morning Ragas
1988
 Nothing But Wind - Composed by the renowned musician "Isaignani" Ilaiyaraaja
 Call of the Valley
1989
 Venu
 Live in Ahmedabad '89
1990
 Immortal Series
1991
 Megh Malhar
1992
 Night Ragas
 Live in Amsterdam '92
 Morning to Midnight Ragas - Afternoon Ragas
 All time Favourites
 Live from Sawai Gandharva Music Festival - Video (VHS)
 Raga-s DU Nord Et Du Sud
 Immortal Series - Flute Fantasia
1993
 Indian Classical Masters
 Daylight Ragas
 Flute - Hariprasad Chaurasia
 Soundscapes - Music of the Rivers - Hari Prasad Chaurasia
1994
 Thumri - The Music of Love
 In A Mellow Mood
 Possession
 Immortal Series - Devine Drupad
 Classic Greats1 - Ideas on Flute
1995
 In Live Concert
 Cascades of Hindustani Music
 Maharishi Gandharva Veda - Pandit Hari Prasad Chaurasia - 4am to 7am Raga Bhairava: Integration
 Maharishi Gandharva Veda - Pandit Hari Prasad Chaurasia - 7am to 10am Raga Gurjari Todi: Compassion
 Maharishi Gandharva Veda - Pandit Hari Prasad Chaurasia - 10am to 1pm Raga Vrindavani Saranga: Greater Energy
 Maharishi Gandharva Veda - Pandit Hari Prasad Chaurasia - 1pm to 4pm Raga Multani: Affuence
 Maharishi Gandharva Veda - Pandit Hari Prasad Chaurasia - 4pm to 7pm Raga Marwa: Coherence
 Maharishi Gandharva Veda - Pandit Hari Prasad Chaurasia - 7pm to 10pm Raga Desh: Joy
 Maharishi Gandharva Veda - Pandit Hari Prasad Chaurasia - 10pm to 1am Raga Abhogi: Peaceful Slumber
 Maharishi Gandharva Veda - Pandit Hari Prasad Chaurasia - 1am to 4am Raga Sindhu Bhairavi: Gentleness
 Hariprasad Chaurasia - Flute
 Malhar-Chandrika
 Music 157 - Live in London
 Music - Flute
 Great Jugalbandis
 Music from the world of OSHO - Above & Beyond
 Prem Yog
 Written on the Wind
 Romantic Themes
 Saptarishi - Live at Siri Fort
 The Mystical Flute of Hari Prasad Chaurasia
 Maestro's Choice
 Basant Bahar
 Chaurasia's Choice
1996
 Hari Prasad Chaurasia & his Divine Flute
 Flute Recital
 Valley Recalls - In search of Peace, Love and Harmony
 Krishna's Flute - Master of the Bansuri
 Classical Encounters - A live Experience with Pt. Hari Prasad Chaurasia
 Fabulous Flute
 Pundit Hari Prasad Chaurasia
 In Concert - Vancouver, B.C
 Hariprasad Chaurasia - Flute
 The Bamboo Flautist of His Generation
 Pt. Hariprasad Chaurasia - Nada in Jerusalem
1997
 Classical Encounters - A Live Experience with Pt. Hariprasad Chaurasia
 Great Jugalbandis
 The Golden Collection (Classical)
 Immortal Essence
 Golden Raga Collection
 Bustan Abraham - Fanar (Guest appearance alongside Zakir Hussain)
1998
 Samarpan-VCD Special 60th Birthday Edition
 The Charms Companion
 Morning to Midnight - Morning to Dusk
 Music for Reiki
1999
 Jugalbandi
 Rasdhaara
 Live Inside Khajuraho
 Live in New Delhi - '89
 Golden Raga Collection
 Musical Titans of India - Jugalbandhi Video (VHS)
 Pure Joy - Positive Energy Music
2000
 Music without Boundaries
 Maaya - Far East
 Hriday - Cuba
 Caravan Spain
 Live Concert at Savai Gandharva Music Festival
 Gurukul - The Guru shishya Parampara
2001
 Adi-Ananth
 Love Divine - Parables of Passion
 Power & Grace - Live at the Saptak Festival 2001
 Discovery of Indian Classical Music
 Flute Duet
2003
 Flute Deity Hariprasad Chaurasia
 The Greatest Hits of Hariprasad Chaurasia
 Salvation - Instrumental Bhajans
 Sounds of Silence
2015
Ajanma - Hariprasad Chaurasia (Solo album)
Year unknown
 La Flute De Pundit Hariprasad Chaurasia
 Hariprasad Chaurasia - The Most Celebrated Flautist of India
 Charm of the Bamboo flute
 Kalpana - Imagination
 A Kaleidoscope of various ragas
 Krishna Utsav
 Kali - Classical Instrumental
 Pt. Hariprasad Chaurasia - the Living Legend of Flute
 Moon Light Moods - Flute Recital
 Pt. Hariprasad Chaurasia - The Living Legend of Flute
 Indian Music
 HariDhwani
 Dancing Water
 Fusion India - Passage of India Series
 Being Still
 Dhammapada - Sacred teaching of Buddha
 The Charms Companion
 Eternity
 Nothing but wind (1988) - Composed by Ilaiyaraaja
With Zakir Hussain
 Making Music (ECM, 1986)
 Maharishi Gandharva Veda - Pandit Hari Prasad Chaurasia - 4am to 7am Raga Bhairava
 Maharishi Gandharva Veda - Pandit Hari Prasad Chaurasia - 7am to 10am Raga Jaita
 Maharishi Gandharva Veda - Pandit Hari Prasad Chaurasia - 10am to 1pm Raga Ahir Lalita
 Maharishi Gandharva Veda - Pandit Hari Prasad Chaurasia - 1pm to 4pm Raga Samanta Saranga
 Maharishi Gandharva Veda - Pandit Hari Prasad Chaurasia - 4pm to 7pm Raga Puriya Dhanashri
 Maharishi Gandharva Veda - Pandit Hari Prasad Chaurasia - 7pm to 10pm Raga Maru Bihaga
 Maharishi Gandharva Veda - Pandit Hari Prasad Chaurasia - 10pm to 1am Raga Gunji Kanada
 Maharishi Gandharva Veda - Pandit Hari Prasad Chaurasia - 1am to 4am Raga Shuddha Vasanta

Contributing artist
 The Rough Guide to the Music of India and Pakistan (World Music Network, 1996)

Music for Bollywood films
Along with Shivkumar Sharma he composed music for
 Chandni
 Darr 
 Lamhe
 Silsila
 Faasle
 Vijay
 Parampara 
 Sahibaan

Music for Telugu films
The music for the film Sirivennela was composed by K. V. Mahadevan which revolves around the role of Hari Prasad, a blind flautist played by Sarvadaman Banerjee and flute renditions by Chaurasia.

Music for English films
Some of his music is used in Mithaq Kazimi's 16 Days in Afghanistan.

References

External links

 HariJi.org
 Official website
 Interview with Choodie Shivaram
 Hariprasad Chaurasia by Mohan Nadkarni

1938 births
Living people
Musicians from Allahabad
Hindustani instrumentalists
Indian flautists
Recipients of the Padma Bhushan in arts
Recipients of the Padma Vibhushan in arts
Recipients of the Sangeet Natak Akademi Award
Officers of the Order of Orange-Nassau
Officiers of the Ordre des Arts et des Lettres
Bansuri players
Hindustani composers
Indian film score composers
Indian male film score composers
20th-century Indian male musicians
Remember Shakti members
20th-century flautists
Recipients of the Sangeet Natak Akademi Fellowship